Sue "Flying" Fish (born ) is an American former motocross racer and stunt actor in the U.S. film industry.

Fish was a pioneering figure in American motorcycling, winning the 1976 and 1977 Women's National Motocross Championship. After a motocross injury, she took up downhill mountain biking, and won a silver medal at the 1994 UCI Downhill World Championships in Vail, Colorado. Fish was Linda Hamilton's stunt double in The Terminator.

Fish was inducted to the AMA Motorcycle Hall of Fame in 2012 and, in 2013 she was named an FIM Legend for her pioneering motocross racing career. Semi-retired since 2009, she works as a personal trainer.

See also
List of Motorcycle Hall of Fame inductees

References

External links

Sue Fish at the AMA Hall of Fame

1958 births
Living people
Sportspeople from Santa Barbara, California
American motocross riders
Female motorcycle racers
American stunt performers
American female cyclists
Downhill mountain bikers
AMA Motocross Championship National Champions
Women motorcyclists
American mountain bikers
21st-century American women